Agnaldo Nunes Magalhães (born 7 November 1976) is a Brazilian professional boxer. As an amateur, he represented his native country twice in the lightweight division at the 1996 and 2000 Summer Olympics.

References

External links
 
 
UOL Esporte Profile

1976 births
Living people
Lightweight boxers
Boxers at the 1996 Summer Olympics
Boxers at the 2000 Summer Olympics
Olympic boxers of Brazil
Brazilian male boxers
People from Piracicaba
Sportspeople from São Paulo (state)